Saoud Al-Ali (Arabic:محمد العبد الله) (born 9 January 1990) is a Qatari footballer. He currently plays as a midfielder .

Career
He formerly played for Al-Rayyan, El Jaish, Al-Kharaitiyat, Al-Shamal, and Lusail .

External links

References

Living people
Qatari footballers
Al-Rayyan SC players
El Jaish SC players
Al Kharaitiyat SC players
Al-Shamal SC players
Lusail SC players
Qatar Stars League players
Qatari Second Division players
Association football midfielders
Place of birth missing (living people)
Year of birth missing (living people)
1990 births